Stavangersk, Stavanger dialect or Stavanger Norwegian ((Bokmål) or  (Nynorsk)) is a dialect of Norwegian used in Stavanger.

The pronunciation and origin resembles that of the written Nynorsk, yet the official written language of the Stavanger municipality is Bokmål.

Phonology

Consonants
  are alveolar .
  is realized as a voiced uvular continuant, either a fricative  or an approximant . It can be voiceless  before a voiceless consonant or a pause. This means that the dialect does not possess retroflex consonants.

Vowels
 The short close back vowel is more front than in Oslo, near-back  rather than back .
 The mid back vowels are somewhat advanced from the fully back position, i.e. near-back, rather than back. The long  is close-mid , whereas the short  is open-mid .
 The long open back vowel is phonetically back , but its short counterpart is front , identical to the cardinal  . It is the most anterior realization of this vowel in Norway.
 The non-native diphthong  has a front starting point .

Tonemes

Phonetic realization
Phonetically, the tonemes of the Stavanger dialect are the same as those of Central Standard Swedish; accent 1 is rising-falling, whereas accent 2 is double falling.

References

Bibliography

Further reading

External links

 A short presentation of differences between the Oslo dialect and the Stavanger dialect (Youtube)
 

Culture in Rogaland
Norwegian dialects
City colloquials